Damien Rascle (born 5 August 1980) is a French former professional footballer who played as a goalkeeper.

Career
Rascle was born in Le Coteau. He joined Scottish Premier League club Kilmarnock from US Albi in a short-term deal. Manager Jim Jefferies had initially offered him an extended deal with the club; however, in July 2009 the keeper failed a requisite medical and was released.

He returned to France with Beauvais for the 2009–10 season.

References

External links 
 
 

1980 births
Living people
People from Le Coteau
Sportspeople from Loire (department)
French footballers
Footballers from Auvergne-Rhône-Alpes
Association football goalkeepers
Championnat National players
Championnat National 2 players
Scottish Premier League players
Rodez AF players
ESA Brive players
US Albi players
Kilmarnock F.C. players
AS Beauvais Oise players
AS Moulins players
French expatriate footballers
French expatriate sportspeople in Scotland
Expatriate footballers in Scotland